Rovňany is a village and municipality in the Poltár District in the Banská Bystrica Region of Slovakia. The village has post, football pitch, public library, foodstuff store and a gym hall. In Rovňany are located a distillery and fruit breeder station.

References

External links
 
 

Villages and municipalities in Poltár District